West End Historic District is a national historic district located at Winston-Salem, Forsyth County, North Carolina.  The district encompasses 508 contributing buildings and 7 contributing structures, in a predominantly residential section of Winston-Salem.  It was a planned picturesque streetcar suburb developed at the turn of the 20th century. The buildings date from about 1887 to 1930, and include notable examples of Classical Revival, Colonial Revival, Queen Anne, and Bungalow / American Craftsman style architecture. Located in the district are the separately listed H. D. Poindexter Houses and Zevely House. Other notable buildings include the St. Paul's Episcopal Church (1928-1929) designed by Ralph Adams Cram, Augsburg Lutheran Church (1926), Friends Meeting House (1927), the First Church of Christ, Scientist (1924), and Joyner's West End Grocery.

It was listed on the National Register of Historic Places in 1986.

References

External links
West End Historic Overlay District Design Review Guidelines (City of Winston Salem)

Historic districts on the National Register of Historic Places in North Carolina
Neoclassical architecture in North Carolina
Colonial Revival architecture in North Carolina
Queen Anne architecture in North Carolina
Buildings and structures in Winston-Salem, North Carolina
National Register of Historic Places in Winston-Salem, North Carolina